Mert and Marcus is the working name of two fashion photographers, Mert Alaş (born 1971) and Marcus Piggott (born 1971), who work together on a collaborative basis. Their work and style is influenced by photographer Guy Bourdin and, together, they have pioneered the use of digital manipulation within their field.

Career 
Mert Alaş, born in Turkey and Marcus Piggott, born in Wales, met in England in 1994 after having worked for a brief period in different areas, Alaş in classical music and Piggott in graphic design. Piggott was an assistant photographer and Alas was a fashion photo modeler. After working together in the photography business, they decided to create a team. When they showed their first photos to Dazed and Confused, the London fashion magazine, they immediately made the cover.

The team now works for such magazines such as Vogue USA, Vogue Paris, Vogue Italia, Interview Magazine, The Love Magazine, W Magazine, Pop Magazine, Numéro and Arena Homme Plus. Some of their major clients are fashion labels such as Dior, Louis Vuitton, Missoni, Giorgio Armani, Roberto Cavalli, Fendi, Kenzo and Miu Miu. They created the images for perfume houses such as Gucci, Yves St Laurent, Givenchy and Lancôme.

Alas and Piggott have also worked with celebrities including Madonna, Marion Cotillard, Cara Delevingne, Adele, Adriana Lima, Lady Gaga, Julia Roberts, Rihanna, Shakira, Jennifer Lopez, Linda Evangelista, Gisele Bündchen, Björk, Gigi Hadid, Kendall Jenner, Lindsay Lohan, Scarlett Johansson, Charlotte Rampling, Bella Hadid, Kylie Minogue, Sophie Ellis-Bextor, Victoria Beckham and most recently shot album covers for Fergie, Taylor Swift and Nicki Minaj.

They have also worked for Rob Dougan's for the cover art of Furious Angels CD.

In 2015, Mert & Marcus were awarded Honorary Fellowship of the Royal Photographic Society

References

External links
 
 
 Agents website

Business duos
Living people
Fashion photographers
English people of Turkish descent
Year of birth missing (living people)